Frederick Richard McIntosh (23 July 1893 – 28 September 1917) was an Australian rules footballer who played with University and Essendon in the Victorian Football League.

Family
The son of Frederick Bury McIntosh (1861–1896), and Pamela Pascoe McIntosh (−1902), née Poole, Frederick Richard McIntosh was born in Fitzroy, Victoria on 23 July 1893.

His father played 36 games in six seasons (1881–1886) for Carlton in the Victorian Football Association (VFA).

Playing career
McIntosh played for University in the Victorian Football League, making his debut in 1913. After 25 games with University he moved to Essendon where he played 14 games in the 1915 VFL season.

Military service
After the outbreak of World War I McIntosh enlisted with the 59th Battalion, 6th Reinforcement of the Australian Imperial Force in July 1915. He left Melbourne on HMAT Nestor on 2 October 1916. On arriving in Europe he saw service at the Western Front. While fighting at Polygon Wood in Belgium he was severely wounded at and died two days later. He was buried at the Lijssenthoek Military Cemetery.

See also
 List of Victorian Football League players who died in active service

References

Sources

 Maplestone, M., Flying Higher: History of the Essendon Football Club 1872–1996, Essendon Football Club, (Melbourne), 1996.

External links

1893 births
Australian rules footballers from Melbourne
University Football Club players
Essendon Football Club players
1917 deaths
Australian military personnel killed in World War I
Burials at Lijssenthoek Military Cemetery
People from Fitzroy, Victoria
Military personnel from Melbourne